Ingaí is a Brazilian municipality located in the state of Minas Gerais. The city belongs to the mesoregion of Campo das Vertentes and to the microregion of Lavras.

Geography 
According to IBGE (2017), the municipality is in the Immediate Geographic Region of Lavras, in the Intermediate Geographic Region of Varginha.

Ecclesiastical circumscription 
The municipality is part of the Roman Catholic Diocese of São João del-Rei.

See also
 List of municipalities in Minas Gerais

References

Municipalities in Minas Gerais